Union Sportive de Chantilly is a football club from Chantilly, Oise, France. It was founded in 1902 and, as of the 2020–21 season, plays in the Championnat National 3, the fifth tier of French football. The club won promotion from the sixth tier at the first attempt, after previously being relegated from the Championnat National 3 in 2019.

Current squad

References

External links
Official website
Club profile on Soccerway

Association football clubs established in 1902
Football clubs in France
Sport in Oise
1902 establishments in France